Ercole is a masculine given name which is also used as a surname. People with the name include:

Given name

A–G
 Ercole dell'Abate (1573–1613), Italian painter
 Ercole Baldini (1933–2022), Italian road racing cyclist
 Ercole Bernabei (1622–1687), Italian composer
 Ercole Boero (1890–1952), Italian water polo player
 Ercole Bottrigari (1531–1612), Italian scholar and mathematician
 Ercole Calvi (1824–1900), Italian painter
 Ercole Cattaneo (1906–date of death unknown), Italian figure skater
 Ercole Chiaia (c.1850–1905, Italian spiritualist 
 Ercole Consalvi (1757–1824), Italian Cardinal
 Ercole Coppola (1603–1658), Italian Roman Catholic prelate
 Ercole Dembowski, Italian astronomer
 Ercole dei Fedeli (c. 1465–c.1504–21), Italian goldsmith and master sword engraver
 Ercole Ferrata (1610–1686) Italian sculptor 
 Ercole Gaibara (c. 1620–1690), Italian composer
 Ercole Gallegati (1911–1990) Italian wrestler and Olympic medalist
 Ercole Gennari (1597–1658), Italian painter
 Ercole Gonzaga (1505 1563), Italian Cardinal
 Ercole Grandi (c.1463–1525), Italian painter
 Ercole Graziadei (1900–1981), Italian lawyer
 Ercole Gualazzini (born 1944), Italian cyclist

H–Z
 Ercole Lamia (died 1591), Italian Roman Catholic prelate 
 Ercole Lupinacci (1933–2016), Italian bishop 
 Ercole Marelli (1867–1922), Italian engineer and entrepreneur
 Ercole Antonio Mattioli (1640–1694), Italian politician
 Ercole Luigi Morselli (1882–1921), Italian writer 
 Ercole Olgeni (1883–1947) Italian rower
 Ercole Pasquini (ca. 1560–1608 or 1619), Italian composer
 Ercole Patti (1903–1976), Italian writer and journalist
 Ercole Procaccini the Elder (1520–1595), Italian painter
 Ercole Procaccini the Younger (c. 1605–1675 or 1680), Italian painter 
 Ercole Rabitti (1921–2009), Italian football striker and manager 
 Ercole Rangoni (died 1527), Italian Cardinal
 Ercole del Rio (c.1718–c.1802), Italian lawyer and author
 Ercole de' Roberti (c.1451–1496), Italian painter
 Ercole Roncaglia (1886–1965), Italian military officer
 Ercole Ruggiero (17th century), Italian painter
 Ercole Sarti (1593–date of death unknown), Italian painter 
 Ercole Setti (c.1530–1618), Italian engraver
 Ercole Spada (born 1937), Italian automobile designer
 Ercole Sassonia (1551–1607), Italian physician
 Ercole Strozzi (1473–1508), Italian poet
 Ercole Tambosi (died 1570), Italian Roman Catholic prelate 
 Ercole Visconti (1646–1712), Italian Roman Catholic prelate

Middle name
 Carlo Ercole Bosoni (1826–1887), Italian composer 
 Pietro Ercole Fava (1669–1744), Italian nobleman

Surname
 Christine D'Ercole, American cyclist
 Francesco Ercole (1884–1945), Italian historian and politician 
 Henry Ercole (died 1764), Maltese philosopher

Fictional characters and pseudonyms
 Ercole Ercoli, pseudonym of Italian politician Palmiro Togliatti 
 Ercole Visconti, one of the characters in the Pixar film Luca

See also
 Ercole (disambiguation)

Surnames from given names
Italian masculine given names